Carmichaelia australis, or common broom,  is a species of pea in the family Fabaceae. It is native to New Zealand and found in both the North and South Islands. Its conservation status (2018) is "Not Threatened" under the New Zealand Threat Classification System.

Taxonomy and naming
The species was first described by Robert Brown in 1825. The specific epithet, australis, means "southern". The earliest collected specimen was collected by Joseph Banks  and Daniel Solander in 1769 (AK102896) and is held in Auckland Museum.

Synonymy
Carmichaelia solandri G.Simpson is accepted as a different species by ILDIS, but not by Plants of the World Online, nor by Allan (1961), nor Heenan (1996). (Heenan's extensive list of synonyms differs from that of Plants of the World Online.) See also: NZFlora Carmichaelia australis.

References

External links
Carmichaelia australis occurrence data from Australasian Virtual Herbarium
NZFlora Carmichaelia australis.

australis
Flora of New Zealand
Plants described in 1825
Taxa named by Robert Brown (botanist, born 1773)